'Amboditavolo is a village and commune in the Vatomandry (district) in the Atsinanana Region, Madagascar.

It is located 30km north of Vatomandry. The municipality is crossed by the Ihefitra river.

References

Populated places in Atsinanana